The CAF Cup was an annual competition organised by the CAF for  domestic leagues runners-up of member associations who have not qualified to the pre-existing CAF international club competition the African Cup of Champions Clubs.

History
The tournament was founded in 1992 modeled after the European UEFA Cup. Trophy named after Moshood Abiola, a Nigerian businessman, publisher and politician as well as being the first Director of Sports in independent Nigeria.

The CAF Cup was the idea of the past CAF president, Issa Hayatou who successfully made 1992 the year of African football. The competition was initiated soon after the successful 1992 African Cup of Nations  in which twelve finalists participated in the competition for the first time in the history of the African competition. 31 teams participated in the first edition of the CAF Cup and the Nigerian club Shooting Stars F.C. were the first to hold the cup after defeating the Ugandan Villa SC in the final.

The trophy became an absolute property to JS Kabylie who have won it outright following their third successive win in 2002 being the one and only team in Africa who is able to show the trophy in his trophy room.

The Moroccan club Raja CA was the last to hold the trophy in 2003 defeating the Cameroonian Cotonsport de Garoua in the final.

In 2004, the CAF Cup was merged with the African Cup Winners' Cup, and was renamed the CAF Confederation Cup, again following the European example of the UEFA Cup.

Format
Only runners-up of the domestic leagues of member associations were eligible to participate in the competition if and only if they were not participating as cup winners of their national associations cup competitions in the African Cup Winners' Cup.

In case the runner-up of the domestic league was not to participate in the CAF Cup, CAF approval was mandatory to accept another team among the top three placed teams of the concerned association to take part in the competition.

All rounds of the competition including the final were played according to the knock-out system of two legs tie. The team which scores a higher aggregate number of goals in the two matches was qualified for the next round.

Records and statistics

Finals

Performance by club

Performance by country

Trivia
JS Kabylie was the only team to reach the final for three successive times between 2000 and 2002 being able to win them all and so became the first and only team to keep the CAF Cup trophy.

See also
African Cup Winners' Cup
CAF Confederation Cup

References

External links
CAF Cup on RSSSF

 
Defunct Confederation of African Football club competitions